Ashok Kumar Das was an Indian politician. He joined the Jay Prakash Movement in 1974 and was political Prisoner under MISA. He was member of Swatantra Party, Utkal Congress, Janata Party (Secular), Janata Party (Secular), Janata Dal, Biju Janata Dal then Janata Dal (Secular).

He was elected to the Odisha Legislative Assembly from Korei in the 1974, 1977, 1990, 1995 and 2000.

He was Leader of Opposition in Odisha Legislative Assembly from 1996 to 1997 post death of Biju Patnaik.

References

Members of the Odisha Legislative Assembly
Swatantra Party politicians
Utkal Congress politicians
Janata Party (Secular) politicians
Janata Dal politicians
Biju Janata Dal politicians
Janata Dal (Secular) politicians
Nationalist Congress Party politicians
People from Jajpur district
1942 births
2008 deaths